Gorenje Mokro Polje is a settlement west of Šentjernej in southeastern Slovenia. The area is part of the traditional region of Lower Carniola. It is now included in the Southeast Slovenia Statistical Region.

The local church, built inside a walled enclosure in the western part of the settlement, is dedicated to Saint Vitus and belongs to the Parish of Šentjernej. It is mentioned in written documents dating to 1436, but owes its current Baroque style to a major rebuilding in the 18th century.

References

External links

Gorenje Mokro Polje on Geopedia

Populated places in the Municipality of Šentjernej